The Xbox technical specifications describe the various components of the Xbox video game console.

Central processing unit

CPU: 32-bit 733 MHz, custom Intel Pentium III Coppermine-based processor in a Micro-PGA2 package (though soldered to the mainboard using BGA). 180 nm process. 
133 MHz 64-bit GTL+ front-side bus (FSB) to GPU (1.06 GB/s bandwidth)
32KB L1 cache. 128 KB on-die L2 cache
SSE floating point SIMD. Four single-precision floating point numbers per clock cycle.
MMX integer SIMD

Memory
Shared graphics memory sub-system
64 MB DDR SDRAM at 200 MHz; in dual-channel 128-bit configuration giving 6400 MB/s (6.4 GB/s)
Maximum of 1.06 GB/s bandwidth accessible by CPU FSB
Theoretical 5.34 GB/s bandwidth shared by rest of the system
Supplied by Hynix or Samsung depending on manufacture date and location

Graphics processing unit

GPU and system chipset: 233 MHz "NV2A" ASIC. Co-developed by Microsoft and Nvidia and essentially a variant of Geforce 3 chips.
Floating-point performance: 20 GFLOPS
Geometry engine: 115 million vertices per second, 125 million particles per second (peak)
4 pixel pipelines with 2 texture units each
Peak fillrate:
Rendering fillrate: 932 megapixels per second (233 MHz × 4 pipelines)
Texture fillrate: 1,864 megatexels per second (932 MP × 2 texture units)
Realistic fillrate:
Rendering fillrate: 250–700 megapixels per second, with Z-buffering, fogging, alpha blending and texture mapping
Texture fillrate: 500–1400 megatexels per second (250-700 MP × 2 texture units)
Peak triangle performance: 29,125,000 32-pixel triangles per second, raw or with 2 textures and lighting (32-pixel divided from peak fillrate)
485,416 triangles per frame at 60 frames per second
970,833 triangles per frame at 30 frames per second
Realistic triangle performance: 7,812,500–21,875,000 32-pixel triangles per second, with 2 textures, lighting, Z-buffering, fogging and alpha blending (32-pixel divided from realistic fillrate)
130,208–364,583 triangles per frame at 60 frames per second
260,416–729,166 triangles per frame at 30 frames per second
4 textures per pass, texture compression, full scene anti-aliasing (NV Quincunx, supersampling, multisampling)
Bilinear, trilinear, and anisotropic texture filtering
Performance lies between a Geforce 3 Series GPU and a Geforce 4 Series GPU. This is due to the added vertex shader present on the ASIC, thus doubling the vertex output compared to Geforce 3 ASICs. Clock speed is the same as the original Geforce 3 series GPU (233MHz) thus slower than Geforce 4 series starting at 250MHz.

Storage

Storage media
2×–5× (2.6 MB/s–6.6 MB/s) CAV DVD-ROM
8 or 10 GB, 3.5 in, 5,400 RPM hard disk formatted to 8 GB with FATX file system
Optional 32 MB memory card for saved game file transfer

Audio

Audio processor: NVIDIA "MCPX" (a.k.a. SoundStorm "NVAPU")
Wolfson Microelectronics XWM9709 AC97 Revision 2.1 Audio Codec
Integrated Parthus DSP for realtime Dolby Digital encoding
64 3D sound channels (up to 256 stereo voices)
HRTF Sensaura 3D enhancement
MIDI DLS2 Support
Monaural, Stereo, Dolby Surround, Dolby Digital Live 5.1, and DTS Surround (DVD movies only) audio output options

Connectivity

Controller ports: 4 proprietary USB 1.1 ports
A/V outputs: composite video, S-Video, component video, HDMI (via 3rd party), SCART, Digital Optical TOSLINK, and stereo RCA analog audio
S-Video requires "Advanced AV Pack", component video requires "High Definition AV Pack", TOSLINK requires either of the two
Resolutions: 480i, 480p, 576i, 576p, 720p, 1080i
Integrated 10/100BASE-TX wired Ethernet with ICS ICS1893AF Physical Layer Transceiver
DVD movie playback (add-on required)

Physical specifications
Weight: 3.86 kg (8.5 lb)
Dimensions: 320 × 100 × 260 mm (12.5 × 4 × 10.5 in)

See also
 nVIDIA nForce

References

Xbox
Xbox (console) hardware
Video game hardware